The Horton Bluff Formation is a geologic formation in Nova Scotia. It preserves fossils dating back to the Carboniferous period. It is located 2.5 kilometres southeast of Avonport Station.

See also 

 List of fossiliferous stratigraphic units in Nova Scotia
Blue Beach

References

Further reading 
 

Geologic formations of Canada
Carboniferous Nova Scotia
Carboniferous southern paleotropical deposits